Tarner may refer to:

Tarner Island, island in Loch Bracadale, Scotland
Tarner Lectures, philosophy of science lecture series at Trinity College, Cambridge